A list of windmills in Pas-de-Calais, France.

External links

French windmills website

Windmills in France
Pas-de-Calais
Buildings and structures in Pas-de-Calais